Jo Nattawut (born October 7, 1989), also known as Smokin' Jo, is a Thai Muay Thai kickboxer. He is a 5-time Lion Fight super welterweight champion and 1-time Lion Fight middleweight champion, as well as the former WMC Super Lightweight champion. He currently competes in ONE Championship for ONE Super Series.

Jo Nattawut is currently ranked #3 in the ONE Featherweight Muay Thai rankings.

Biography

Early years
Jo Nattawut (real name Nattawut Somkhun) was born in Nakhon Ratchasima in the Northeastern Isan region of Thailand. Jo grew up playing football at school and spent his weekends working on local rice farms.

Early career
Jo first discovered Muay Thai at 10 years old, when he saw his football coach hitting a heavy bag. Jo asked to join, starting to train Muay Thai after football practice. He took his first fight at the age of 10 with 12 hours notice. Eventually, he decided to join a Muay Thai camp near his house and continue training in his free time. When he was 18 years old, Jo moved to Bangkok to join a gym and get serious about Muay Thai.

After a year and a half of no success in Muay Thai, Jo gave up Muay Thai and moved to Ko Pha-ngan island. During the day, he worked at a restaurant, hotel, and fitness gym, and at night he sold whiskey on the beach for tourist parties. Jo also organized Muay Thai showcases for tourists and occasionally put himself on the card to fight.

Move to the United States and career resurgence
Jo moved to the United States in early 2013. He first lived in Colorado, where he fell in love with snowboarding. He moved to Atlanta, Georgia in late 2013, where he taught kickboxing and Muay Thai classes.

In the United States, Jo fought for Lion Fight, an American Muay Thai organization based in Las Vegas. Nattawut's first fight was with one week's notice, at Lion Fight 17 against Cosmo Alexandre. Jo won by split decision. Nattawut's next fight was infamously taken on 24 hours notice against Sean Kearney at Lion Fight 19. He ended up winning the fight by unanimous decision.

At Lion Fight 22, Jo Nattawut defeated Salah Khalifa to win the Lion Fight Super Welterweight Championship. He would go on to successfully defend the super welterweight title 5 times: Charlie Peters at Lion Fight 24, Cedric Manhoef at Lion Fight 28, Hasan Toy at Lion Fight 33, Kengsiam Nor Sripueng at Lion Fight 35, and Petchtanong Banchamek at Lion Fight 37. He also defeated fellow Thai expatriate fighter Malaipet Sasiprapa at Lion Fight 32 to win the Lion Fight Middleweight Championship.

ONE Championship
After winning multiple Muay Thai titles at the Lion Fight tournaments in the United States, including the Lion Fight Super Welterweight and Lion Fight Middleweight Titles, Nattawut signed a contract with ONE Championship. He made his ONE debut on April 20, 2018 at ONE Championship: Heroes of Honor in Manila, facing legendary kickboxer Giorgio Petrosyan. He lost to Petrosyan by unanimous decision.

His next fight was against Yohann Drai at ONE Championship: Pursuit of Power in Kuala Lumpur on July 13, 2018. Nattawut would knock out Drai in the first round, giving him his first win in ONE Championship. On November 9, 2018, he faced George Mann of Scotland at ONE Championship: Heart of the Lion in Singapore, where he won by unanimous decision.

On February 16, 2019, Jo Nattawut would return to fight in Thailand for the first time since moving to the United States at ONE Championship: Clash of Legends in Bangkok. His opponent at the event was Samy Sana of France, whom he defeated by unanimous decision.

2019 ONE Kickboxing Featherweight World Grand Prix
Jo Nattawut was selected to compete in the ONE Super Series Kickboxing Featherweight World Grand Prix, which included Yodsanklai Fairtex, Giorgio Petrosyan, and Dzhabar Askerov. His opponent for the Quarter-Finals was Sasha Moisa, a Ukrainian fighter who also competes in Lethwei in the World Lethwei Championship (itself a partner of ONE Championship). In the Grand Prix Quarter-Finals at ONE Championship: Enter the Dragon in Singapore, he defeated Sasha Moisa via TKO, knocking down the Ukrainian 3 times in the third round, securing a win and advancing to the Grand Prix Semi-Finals.

In the Kickboxing Featherweight Grand Prix Semi-Finals, he was set to face Giorgio Petrosyan a second time at ONE Championship: Dreams of Gold in Bangkok. However, in his rematch with Petrosyan, Nattawut lost by knockout in the first round, getting eliminated from the Kickboxing Featherweight World Grand Prix.

Jo currently trains at his own gym, United Training Center, located in Atlanta, Georgia.

2021 ONE Kickboxing Featherweight World Grand Prix
After two years away, Jo Nattawut is scheduled to make his return against Yurik Davtyan in an alternate bout for the 2021 ONE Kickboxing Featherweight Grand Prix at ONE Championship: First Strike on October 15, 2021. However, the fight was removed from the card for undisclosed reasons. Nattawut's fight with Davtyan was eventually rescheduled for ONE Championship: NextGen II on November 12, 2021. Nattawut won by knockout in the first round.

He was originally set to face fellow Grand Prix alternate Dovydas Rimkus at ONE: Only the Brave on January 28, 2022. However, after Grand Prix semifinalist Marat Grigorian tested positive for COVID-19, Nattawut was rebooked to face Chingiz Allazov in the Grand Prix semifinals. Nattawut lost by first-round knockout.

Return to Muay Thai
Nattawut was scheduled to face Jamal Yusupov under Muay Thai rules at ONE 159 on July 22, 2022. He lost by unanimous decision.

Titles and accomplishments
World Muaythai Council
WMC World Super Lightweight Championship
 Lion Fight
 2016 Lion Fight Middleweight Champion
 2015 Lion Fight Super Welterweight Champion (5 defenses)
 World Professional Muaythai Federation 
 2009 WPMF World 140 lbs. Champion

Fight record

|-  style="background:#FFBBBB;"
| 2022-07-22 || Loss ||align=left| Jamal Yusupov || ONE 159 || Kallang, Singapore || Decision (Unanimous) || 3 || 3:00
|-
|- style="background:#FFBBBB;"
| 2022-01-28|| Loss ||align=left| Chingiz Allazov || ONE: Only the Brave || Kallang, Singapore || KO (Left Hook) || 1 || 1:55
|-
! style=background:white colspan=9 |
|-
|-  style="background:#cfc;"
| 2021-11-12|| Win ||align=left| Yurik Davtyan || ONE Championship: NextGen II || Singapore || KO (Right Cross) || 1 || 2:50 
|- style="background:#FFBBBB;"
|  2019-08-16 || Loss|| align="left" | Giorgio Petrosyan ||  ONE Championship: Dreams of Gold || Bangkok, Thailand || KO (Left Straight) || 1 || 2:44
|-
! style=background:white colspan=9 |
|-  style="background:#cfc;"
|  2019-05-17 || Win || align="left" | Sasha Moisa ||  |ONE Championship: Enter the Dragon  || Kallang, Singapore || TKO (3 Knockdown Rule) || 3 || 1:24
|-
! style=background:white colspan=9 |
|-  style="background:#CCFFCC;"
| 2019-02-16|| Win ||align=left| Samy Sana || ONE Championship: Clash of Legends ||Thailand || Decision (Unanimous)|| 3 || 3:00
|-
|- style="background:#cfc;"
|2018-11-09 || Win ||align=left| George Mann || ONE Championship: Heart of the Lion || Kallang, Singapore || Decision (Unanimous) || 3 || 3:00
|-
|-  bgcolor="#CCFFCC"
| 2018-07-13 || Win ||align=left| Yohann Drai || ONE Championship: Pursuit of Power || Kuala Lumpur, Malaysia || KO (Punches)|| 1 || 2:59
|-
|- style="background:#FFBBBB;"
|2018-04-20 || Loss ||align=left| Giorgio Petrosyan || ONE Championship: Heroes of Honor ||Manila, Philippines || Decision || 3 || 3:00
|-
|- style="background:#CCFFCC;"
| 2017-07-28|| Win ||align=left| Petchtanong Banchamek || Lion Fight 37 || Ledyard, United States || Decision (Unanimous)|| 5 || 3:00
|-
! style=background:white colspan=9 |
|-
|-  style="background:#CCFFCC;"
| 2017-03-03|| Win ||align=left| Kengsiam Nor Sripueng || Lion Fight 35 || Ledyard, United States || KO (Knees to the leg) || 3 || 2:40
|-
! style=background:white colspan=9 |
|-
|-  style="background:#CCFFCC;"
| 2017-01-13|| Win ||align=left| Yan Zhao || Superstar Fight 7 || Hunan, China || Decision || 3 || 3:00
|-  style="background:#CCFFCC;"
| 2016-11-18|| Win ||align=left| Hasan Toy || Lion Fight 33 || United States || Decision (Unanimous) || 5 || 3:00
|-
! style=background:white colspan=9 |
|-
|-  style="background:#CCFFCC;"
| 2016-10-21|| Win ||align=left| Malaipet Sasiprapa || Lion Fight 32 || Las Vegas, United States || Decision (Unanimous) || 5 || 3:00
|-
! style=background:white colspan=9 |
|-  style="background:#cfc;"
| 2016-07-02|| Win||align=left| Mo Zhuang || Superstar Fight 4 || Shenzhen, China || KO  || 2 ||
|-  style="background:#FFBBBB;"
| 2016-05-27|| Loss ||align=left| Regian Eersel || Lion Fight 29 || United States || KO (Right high kick) || 5 || 
|-
|-  style="background:#CCFFCC;"
| 2016-02-26|| Win ||align=left| Cedric Manhoef || Lion Fight 28 || United States || Decision || 5 || 3:00
|-
! style=background:white colspan=9 |
|-  style="background:#CCFFCC;"
| 2015-09-25|| Win ||align=left| Charlie Peters|| Lion Fight 24 || Ledyard, United States || KO (Elbows) || 3 || 
|-
! style=background:white colspan=9 |
|-
|-  style="background:#CCFFCC;"
| 2015-05-22|| Win ||align=left| Salah Khalifa || Lion Fight 22 || United States || Decision || 5 || 3:00
|-
! style=background:white colspan=9 |
|-
|-  style="background:#CCFFCC;"
| 2015-02-20|| Win ||align=left| Richard Abraham || Lion Fight 20 || United States || Decision || 5 || 3:00
|-  style="background:#CCFFCC;"
| 2014-11-21|| Win ||align=left| Sean Kerney || Lion Fight 19 || Ledyard, United States || Decision || 5 || 3:00
|-  style="background:#CCFFCC;"
| 2014-08-01|| Win ||align=left| Cosmo Alexandre || Lion Fight 17 || United States || Decision || 5 || 3:00
|-  style="background:#fbb;"
| 2012-03-03|| Loss||align=left| Toby Smith ||  Domination 8 || Australia || Decision || 5 || 3:00
|-
| colspan=9 | Legend:

References

1989 births
Welterweight kickboxers
Middleweight kickboxers
Jo Nattawut
Thai expatriates in the United States
Living people
ONE Championship kickboxers
Jo Nattawut